The Lima was a sailing ship.

Captain Yule was in charge of the Lima. The Lima arrived in Moreton Bay on 3 November 1849.

References

1846 ships
Ships built in Scotland
History of immigration to Australia
Sailing ships of the United Kingdom
History of Queensland
Pre-Separation Queensland